The Notting Hill Carnival is an annual Caribbean festival event that has taken place in London since 1966 on the streets of the Notting Hill area of Kensington, each August over two days (the August bank holiday Monday and the preceding Sunday).

It is led by members of the British Caribbean community, and attracts around two and a half million people annually, making it one of the world's largest street festivals, and a significant event in British African Caribbean and  British Indo-Caribbean culture. In 2006, the UK public voted it onto a list of icons of England.

Notting Hill Carnival 2023 will be held on Bank Holiday Sunday 27 August 2023.

History 
The roots of the Notting Hill Carnival that took shape in the mid-1960s had two separate but connected strands. A "Caribbean Carnival" was held on 30 January 1959 in St Pancras Town Hall as a response to the problematic state of race relations at the time; the UK's first widespread racial attacks, the Notting Hill race riots in which 108 people were charged, had occurred the previous year. The 1959 event, held indoors and televised by the BBC, was organised by the Trinidadian journalist and activist Claudia Jones (often described as "the mother of the Notting Hill Carnival") in her capacity as editor of influential black newspaper The West Indian Gazette, and directed by Edric Connor; showcasing elements of a Caribbean carnival in a cabaret style, it featured among other things the Mighty Terror singing the calypso "Carnival at St Pancras", The Southlanders, Cleo Laine, the Trinidad All Stars and Hi–fi steel bands dance troupe, finishing with a Caribbean Carnival Queen beauty contest and a Grand Finale Jump-Up by West Indians who attended the event.

Another important strand was the "hippie" London Free School-inspired festival in Notting Hill that became the first organised outside event, in August 1966. The prime mover was Rhaune Laslett, who was not aware of the indoor events when she first raised the idea. This festival was a more diverse Notting Hill event to promote cultural unity. A street party for neighbourhood children turned into a carnival procession when Russell Henderson's steel band (who had played at the earlier Claudia Jones events) went on a walkabout. By 1970, "the Notting Hill Carnival consisted of 2 music bands, the Russell Henderson Combo and Selwyn Baptiste's Notting Hill Adventure Playground Steelband and 500 dancing spectators."

Duke Vin, full name Vincent George Forbes, is credited as being a co-founder of Notting Hill Carnival, having brought the first sound system to the United Kingdom in 1955 when he was a stowaway on a ship from Jamaica to the United Kingdom, and brought what is thought to be the very first sound system to the Notting Hill Carnival in 1973, which paved the way for the many sound systems that operate at carnival today. Duke Vin became a legend in Ladbroke Grove and had a huge influence on the popularisation of reggae and ska in Britain, and played at Notting Hill Carnival with his sound system, ‘Duke Vin the Tickler’s’, every year from the year it was founded until his death in 2012. 

Emslie Horniman's Pleasance (in the Kensal Green district of the area), has been the carnival's traditional starting point. Among the early bands to participate were Ebony Steelband and Metronomes Steelband. As the carnival had no permanent staff and head office, the Mangrove restaurant in Notting Hill, run by another Trinidadian, Frank Crichlow, came to function as an informal communication hub and office address for the carnival's organisers.

Leslie Palmer, who was director from 1973 to 1975, is credited with "getting sponsorship, recruiting more steel bands, reggae groups and sound systems, introducing generators and extending the route." He encouraged traditional masquerade, and for the first time in 1973 costume bands and steel bands from the various islands took part in the street parade, alongside the introduction of stationary sound systems, as distinct from those on moving floats, which, as Alex Pascall has explained, "created the bridge between the two cultures of carnival, reggae and calypso." "Notting Hill Carnival became a major festival in 1975 when it was organised by a young teacher, Leslie Palmer." The carnival was also popularised by live radio broadcasts by Pascall on his daily Black Londoners programme for BBC Radio London.

By 1976, the event had become definitely Caribbean in flavour, with around 150,000 people attending. However, in that year and several subsequent years, the carnival was marred by riots, in which predominantly Caribbean youths fought with police – a target due to the continuous harassment the population felt they were under. During this period, there was considerable press coverage of the disorder, which some felt took an unfairly negative and one-sided view of the carnival. For a while it looked as if the event would be banned. Prince Charles was one of the few establishment figures who supported the event. Leila Hassan campaigned for Arts Council England to recognise the Notting Hill Carnival as an art form. Since 1978 the national Panorama competition is held on the Saturday preceding the carnival.

Concerns about the size of the event resulted in London's then mayor, Ken Livingstone, setting up a Carnival Review Group to look into "formulating guidelines to safeguard the future of the Carnival". An interim report by the review resulted in a change to the route in 2002. When the full report was published in 2004, it recommended that Hyde Park be used as a "savannah" (an open space to draw crowds away from residential areas), though the proposal of such a move attracted concerns, including that the Hyde Park event might overshadow the original street carnival.

In 2003, the Notting Hill Carnival was run by a limited company, the Notting Hill Carnival Trust Ltd. A report by the London Development Agency on the 2002 Carnival estimated that the event contributed around £93 million to the London and UK economy, set against an estimated £6–10 million costs. However, the 2016 residents' survey commissioned by local Conservative Member of Parliament (MP) Victoria Borwick found that while 6% of businesses reported an upturn in trade, many others boarded up their shopfronts and lost business due to closure.

For 2014, a Notting Hill Carnival illustrated guide was created by official city guide to London visitlondon.com. The infographic includes Carnival tips, transport information and a route map. The book Carnival: A Photographic and Testimonial History of the Notting Hill Carnival, by Ishmahil Blagrove and Margaret Busby, was also published in August 2014 by Rice N Peas.

In 2015 there was controversy when the Carnival Trust charged journalists £100 to cover the event, and demanded copies of all work produced relating to the event within three weeks of the end of the Carnival. The National Union of Journalists organised a boycott of the event. In 2016 the charge remained; however, in June 2017, the Carnival's new event management team introduced a revised media policy, with no request for any accreditation fees.

In 2016, when the Golden Jubilee of Notting Hill Carnival was celebrated, 42 hours of live video coverage was broadcast by music live-streaming platform Boiler Room from the Rampage, Deviation, Aba Shanti-I, Channel One, Nasty Love, Saxon Sound, King Tubbys, Gladdy Wax and Disya Jeneration soundsystems.

The 2020 carnival was cancelled due to the ongoing COVID-19 pandemic, although free live-streamed events were shown online across four channels. On 18 June 2021, it was announced that the 2021 Carnival would not take place either, due to "ongoing uncertainty and Covid-19 risk".

In 2022, Notting Hill Carnival returned after two-year hiatus. It started with a run to remember 72 victims of the Grenfell Tower fire from 2017.

Culture of the carnival
Professor David Dabydeen has stated: 
Carnival is not alien to British culture. Bartholomew Fair and Southwark Fair in the 18th century were moments of great festivity and release. There was juggling, pickpocketing, whoring, drinking, masquerade – people dressed up as the Archbishop of Canterbury and indulged in vulgar acts. It allowed people a space to free-up but it was banned for moral reasons and for the antiauthoritarian behaviour that went on like stoning of constables. Carnival allowed people to dramatise their grievances against the authorities on the street... Notting Hill Carnival single-handedly revived this tradition and is a great contribution to British cultural life." 

This huge street festival attracts around one million people every year to Notting Hill and highlights Caribbean and Black diasporic cultures. Carnival uses influences from many other festivals around the world. Authors Julian Henriques and Beatrice Ferrara claim the festival draws mainly on the  Trinidad Carnival as well as Crop Over, Canadian Caribana in Toronto and the US Labor Day Festival in Brooklyn. They also explain that Notting Hill Carnival is dually influenced by its diasporic cultures and its own country's influences. Henriques and Ferrara claim: "Carnival also has an explosive auditory impact due to its cacophony of sounds, in which soca, steel bands, calypso floats and sound systems mix and mingle in a multi-media and multi-sensory event" (Ferrara 132). This mixture of percussion, with emphasis on the beat and rhythm, leads to the extreme dancing in the streets for which Carnival is known, with citizens participating to the beat of the music, using mud and paint, dancing with the lower parts of the body. Henriques and Ferrara explain that people emphasize the "baseness" of the music, with everything being about the "bottom": the ground, the bottom of the body, and the bottom of the beat. The festival uses influences from the Jamaican dancehalls and British clubs, and the music is made loud enough for participants to feel the beat. The vibrations from the speakers allow people to better connect with the ground and bring their experience to another level.

The authors of the same article further explain how Notting Hill Carnival also creates "territory". The parade route portion of the Carnival is where carnival floats play both recorded and live music and circulate the street, visualizing the boundaries of Carnival and marking its territory. The circulating movement of the Carnival parade is also an extending of space through sound. Territorializing the space through sounds of African beats, such as the pan, fosters a sense of identity and unity for the overall Carnival.

The Carnival further diversified in 1984 with the appearance of the London School of Samba. Formed in that year, they were the first samba school in the UK and have paraded every year since (with the exception of 1992). Other samba schools have also paraded in Carnival, notably Acadêmicos de Madureira (1992–94), Quilombo do Samba (1993–2006) and the Paraiso School of Samba (since 2002). These groups are also notable as they sometimes parade with more than 200 performers, along with several decorated floats.

Media coverage 
Compared to other major music and art events such as Glastonbury Festival, Notting Hill Carnival has historically struggled to gain any live coverage outside of local media. The majority of carnival live broadcasts have been traditionally on BBC London radio (hitting a peak of coverage in the years of 2003 and 2004), and on BBC Radio 1Xtra in more recent years.

Public order 
Since the carnival did not have local authority permission, initial police involvement was aimed at preventing it taking place at all, which resulted in regular confrontation and riots. In 1976, the police had been expecting hostility due to what they deemed as trouble the year before. Consequently, after discovering pickpockets in the crowd, police took a heavy-handed approach against the large congregation of black people and it became "no-man's land". The 1600-strong police force violently broke up the carnival, with the arrest of 60 people. In the aftermath of the event, the carnival was portrayed in a very pointed way, with those aiding the riots lumped together as the "trouble-makers" responsible.

After the 1976 Notting Hill Carnival the Police Federation pressed for the introduction of riot shields to protect police from objects thrown at them, although the shields also had the potential for aggressive use, as in 1977.
A change of policy came after a confrontation in 1987, when the Carnival was allowed to take place with police adopting a more conciliatory approach. During the 2000 Carnival, two men were murdered; and future policing, while conciliatory, resulted in police deployment in large numbers: upwards of 11,000.

The Mayor of London's Carnival Review Group's report (published in 2004,) led to the parades taking a circular rather than linear route, but a recommendation to relocate the event in Hyde Park has been resisted. Some crimes associated with the carnival have taken place on its periphery: in 2007, two teenagers were wounded in separate shooting incidents just outside the carnival area on the Monday evening; however, police said there had been a decline in the number of carnival-linked arrests in comparison with the previous year.

The 2008 Carnival was marred by rioting at the very end of the weekend, involving about 40 youths battling with police, and more than 300 people were arrested. The carnival has come under criticism for its cost to the London taxpayer, with the cost of policing the event more than £6,000,000; however, it is argued that this should be put into context since the carnival is estimated to bring approximately £93,000,000 into the local economy.

Despite talk of the 2011 Carnival being cancelled in the wake of the early August riots in the UK that year, it was seen as being relatively peaceful. Five people were arrested for a stabbing at Ladbroke Grove. The victim was one of 86 people who were taken to hospital. In total 245 people were detained by police over the two days of the carnival.

In recent years, there has been much less serious trouble, and it is generally viewed very positively by the authorities as a dynamic celebration of London's multicultural diversity, though dominated by the Caribbean culture. However, there has been controversy over the public safety aspects of holding such a well-attended event in narrow streets in a small area of London. A survey in 2016 commissioned by local Conservative MP Victoria Borwick found that "Nine out of ten residents living along the route of the Notting Hill Carnival flee their homes to escape the 'frightening and intimidating' event."

In 2016 there were over 450 arrests, and five people were hurt in four knife attacks; however, the commander in charge of policing carnival, David Musker, said that the number of arrests had been inflated by the new Psychoactive Substances Act 2016. Based on relative attendance figures, it has been said that crime rates for the Notting Hill Carnival and for Glastonbury or other music festivals are comparable, and Ishmahil Blagrove, co-author of the book Carnival: A Photographic and Testimonial History of the Notting Hill Carnival, states: "Notting Hill Carnival, compared to Trinidad or Brazil, is one of the safest in the world."
A report in 2004 by the GLA Policing Policy Director, Lee Jasper, criticised authorities for not addressing safety issues involved in over a million people attending a small inner-city residential area, quoting the Met Police spokesman Dave Musker, who in November 2016 said: "Each year … we come exceptionally close to a major catastrophic failure of public safety where members of the public will suffer serious injury."

In the three weeks running up to the 2017 event, the police made 656 arrests, a pre-emptive crackdown. There were 313 arrests during the two days of the 2017 Carnival, compared with 454 the previous year. On both days, a minute's silence in tribute to the victims of the Grenfell Tower fire was observed at 3 pm by Carnival-goers, many of whom wore "green for Grenfell".

During the 2018 event, due to the rising levels of violent crime in London, police deployed metal detectors to prevent weapons being brought to the event. During the event, 30 police officers were injured in the line of duty, 36 weapons were confiscated and 373 arrests were made by the Metropolitan Police Service.

Since 1987 there have been six deaths caused by violence at Notting Hill Carnival: 
 30 August 1987 – Michael Augustine Galvin, 23, stallholder – stabbed.
 26 August 1991 – Nicholas John Hanscomb, 38, bled to death after being stabbed in the thigh.
 28 August 2000 – Greg Fitzgerald Watson, 21, stabbed to death after an argument over food.
 28 August 2000 – Abdul Munam Bhatti, 28; the police treated his attack as racially motivated by a gang of "mainly black males", as described by a witness. Nine men were sentenced for violent disorder in 2002.
 30 August 2004 – Lee Christopher Surbaran, 27, was shot by a gang using a machine pistol "for showing disrespect"; in 2005, three men were jailed for life for his murder.
 29 August 2022 – 21-year-old man was stabbed and taken to a west London hospital where he died. The victim was identified as rapper Takayo Nembhard, also known as TKorStretch.

Transport
Transport for London run special limited-stop bus services from South London to the Carnival area:
2X from West Norwood and Brixton
36X from Peckham and Camberwell
436X from Peckham and Camberwell

Some London Underground stations close or are exit-only to ease congestion.

Image gallery

See also 
 Leeds West Indian Carnival (also known as the "Chapeltown Carnival")
 St Pauls Carnival, Bristol 
 Culture of London

References

Further reading 
 Abner Cohen, "Drama and Politics in the Development of a London Carnival", in Ronald Frankenberg (ed.), Custom and Conflict in British Society, Manchester University Press, 1982, pp. 313–44.
 Ishmahil Blagrove and Margaret Busby (eds), Carnival: A Photographic and Testimonial History of the Notting Hill Carnival, London: Rice N Peas Books, 2014. .

External links 

 
 "The Official Guide to Notting Hill Carnival", Street Event Company.
 Notting Hill Carnival 2023 
 Notting Hill Carnival at CarnivalInfo.com
 
 
 "The art(s) of Carnival", Arts Council England podcast on 50th anniversary of Notting Hill Carnival, 2016. Soundcloud. See also "Notting Hill Carnival celebrates golden jubilee", Arts Council England, 24 August 2016.
 London School Of Samba – Notting Hill Carnival Archive – The themes paraded by the London School of Samba since their debut year in 1984.

Carnival
1966 establishments in England
Afro-Caribbean culture in London
Annual events in London
August events
Black British culture in London
Carnivals in the United Kingdom
Festivals in London
Festivals of Caribbean culture abroad
Festivals of multiculturalism
Multiculturalism in the United Kingdom
Music festivals established in 1966
Parades in London
Recurring events established in 1965
Summer events in England